More London, part of an area known as London Bridge City, is a development on the south bank of the River Thames, immediately south-west of Tower Bridge in London. It is owned by the Kuwaiti sovereign wealth fund.

It includes the City Hall, a sunken amphitheatre called The Scoop, office blocks, shops, restaurants, cafes, and a pedestrianized area containing open-air sculptures and fountains lit by coloured lights. The Hilton London Tower Bridge hotel opened in September 2006.

The buildings were designed by Foster and Partners architects. The buildings are known as 1 & 6 More London Place, and 2, 3, 4 and 7 More London Riverside. The public area, which includes The Scoop, a fountain and planting areas, was designed by Townshend Landscape Architects.

There are frequently outdoor exhibitions and cultural events in More London. For most of 2005 there was a popular open-air exhibition of large environmental photographs called Earth from the Air.

In 2007, the development was shortlisted for the Carbuncle Cup architecture prize, an annual competition by Building Design for "the ugliest building in the United Kingdom completed in the last 12 months."

"The Rill", a brick water channel that ran along one walkway of the area, was filled in during 2018.

Ownership

The site including its open spaces is owned by St Martins Property Group and managed by Savills.

References

External links

Official More London lettings web site (managed by Knight Frank LLP)
 (managed by Savills)

Redevelopment projects in London
Buildings and structures in the London Borough of Southwark
Tourist attractions in the London Borough of Southwark
Privately owned public spaces